Deacon Hill is a conspicuous ice-covered peak, 330 m, on the divide between Bridger Bay and Norway Bight in the western part of Coronation Island, in the South Orkney Islands. First seen in 1821 by Captain Nathaniel Palmer and Captain George Powell on the occasion of their joint cruise, and roughly charted on Powell's map published in 1822. Recharted in 1933 by Discovery Investigations personnel on the RRS Discovery II, who named it for George E.R. Deacon, member of the hydrological staff of the Discovery Committee.

References

Mountains of the South Orkney Islands